Octavian Goga (1 April 1881 – 7 May 1938) was a Romanian politician, poet, playwright, journalist, and translator.

Life and politics 

Goga was born in Rășinari, near Sibiu.

Goga was an active member in the Romanian nationalistic movement in Transylvania and of its leading group, the Romanian National Party (PNR) in Austro-Hungary. Before World War I, Goga was arrested by the Hungarian authorities. At various intervals before the union of Transylvania with Romania in 1918, Goga took refuge in Romania, becoming active in literary and political circles. Because of his political activity in Romania, the Hungarian state sentenced him to death in absentia.

During World War I, he joined the Romanian Army and took part as a soldier in the Dobruja campaign.

Together with Vasile Goldiș, Ioan Lupaș, and Silviu Dragomir, Octavian Goga left the PNR in 1926 and joined General Alexandru Averescu's People's Party (PP), a populist movement created upon the war's end. Interestingly, Goga, Goldiș, Lupaș and Dragomir were all Orthodox, whereas the PNR leader Iuliu Maniu and other remaining members of the PNR were Greek-Catholic.

Goga clashed with Averescu over the latter's conflict with King Carol II. Together with Goldiș, Lupaș and Dragomir, Goga founded the National Agrarian Party on April 10, 1932. This party he led into an alliance with A. C. Cuza's far-right, anti-Semitic National-Christian Defense League, forming the National Christian Party on July 14, 1935.

When the National Liberal Party lost the elections in December 1937, King Carol II appointed Goga Prime Minister of Romania, although the National Christian Party had obtained only 9.15% of the votes for the house. Carol II expected the government to be transitional, allowing him to get rid of the party system. He wrote in his diary that he was conscious that the government would not last long and that, after its collapse, he would be able to free his country and himself from the tyranny and the petty interests of the parties. This calculation proved correct. However, the King miscalculated the impact of the anti-Semitic measures of the Goga cabinet, which he had to deal with throughout his personal regime (the so-called royal dictatorship) that he established on February 10, 1938. The Goga cabinet stripped the Jews of their citizenship, limited their right to work or simply harassed them through its anti-Semitic measures, in an effort to gain the support of the electors of the Iron Guard, another anti-Semitic movement and the rival of both the National Christian Party and the King. As a result, the Goga cabinet damaged the Romanian economy and the relations with France, Great Britain and the League of Nations and strengthened the Iron Guard. Its „revision of the Romanian citizenship”, as implemented by King Carol II's personal regime, denaturalised 225,222 Jews, i.e. approximately 30% of the Jewish population.

The paramilitary wing of the National Christian Party, the Lănceri (meaning  "Lancers", the word was derived from LANC, the Romanian acronym of National-Christian Defense League) contributed to the chaos, attacking both Jews and Iron Guard members.

Carol II first pushed towards a victory of the government in the snap elections in March 1938, which he had called on January 18, 1938. However, he soon abandoned Goga, preparing a coup together with the minister of the Interior Armand Călinescu, a former member of the National Peasants' Party, who acted as a guarantee for the king in the government. The coup was probably precipitated when Goga negotiated an electoral agreement with Corneliu Zelea Codreanu, the leader of the Iron Guard, on February 8, 1938, thus posing a considerable threat to the King's power. On February 9, 1938, Carol II, Călinescu and the former national liberal prime minister Gheorghe Tătărescu set the coup for the next day. On February 10, 1938, Carol II received Goga and told him to postpone the snap elections, whereupon Goga resigned. Goga refused to participate in the national unity government the king appointed the same day and withdrew to his estate in Ciucea, Transylvania, where he suffered a stroke on 5 May 1938. He died two days later, on May 7, 1938.

Quotations 

In press interviews at the time Goga said the following:

Writings

Poetry
 Cărbunii ("The Pieces of Coal")
 Rugăciune ("A Prayer")
 Plugarii ("The Ploughmen")
 Oltul ("The Olt River")
 Din larg ("From the High Seas")
 Profetul ("The Prophet")
 Ceahlăul ("The Ceahlău")
 O ramură întârziată ("A Tardy Branch")
 Trecutul ("The Past")
 Apus ("Sunset")
 Mare eternă ("The Eternal Sea")
 În mine câteodată ("At Times within Me")
 Toamna("Autumn")
 Noi ("Us")

Plays
 Domnul notar ("Mr. Notary")
 Meșterul Manole (see Meșterul Manole)

References

External links

 
 

1881 births
1938 deaths
Antisemitism in Romania
People from Sibiu County
Christian fascists
Ethnic Romanian politicians in Transylvania
Members of the Romanian Orthodox Church
Austro-Hungarian emigrants to Romania
Romanian National Party politicians
People's Party (interwar Romania) politicians
National Agrarian Party politicians
National Christian Party politicians
Prime Ministers of Romania
Romanian Ministers of Interior
Romanian Ministers of Culture
Romanian Ministers of Education
Leaders of political parties in Romania
Titular members of the Romanian Academy
Romanian fascists
Romanian Freemasons
Romanian journalists
Romanian male poets
Romanian translators
Male dramatists and playwrights
20th-century Romanian poets
20th-century Romanian dramatists and playwrights
20th-century Romanian male writers
20th-century translators
20th-century journalists
Leaders ousted by a coup